Most District is a district in the Ústí nad Labem Region of the Czech Republic. Its capital is the city of Most.

Administrative division
Most District is divided into two administrative districts of municipalities with extended competence: Most and Litvínov.

List of municipalities
Cities and towns are marked in bold:

Bečov -
Bělušice -
Braňany -
Brandov -
Český Jiřetín -
Havraň -
Hora Svaté Kateřiny -
Horní Jiřetín -
Klíny -
Korozluky -
Lišnice -
Litvínov -
Lom -
Louka u Litvínova -
Lužice -
Malé Březno -
Mariánské Radčice -
Meziboří -
Most -
Nová Ves v Horách -
Obrnice -
Patokryje -
Polerady -
Skršín -
Volevčice -
Želenice

Geography

Most District borders Germany in the north. The terrain is very varied and goes from flat in the south to mountainous in the north. The territory extends into three geomorphological mesoregions: Most Basin (southwest and centre), Ore Mountains (north) and Central Bohemian Uplands (southeast).

The most important river is the Bílina, which drains the entire territory. Its most important tributary is the Srpina.

České Středohoří is a protected landscape area that extends into the district, with a small part in the southeast of the district.

Demographics

Most populated municipalities

Economy
The largest employers with its headquarters in Most District and at least 500 employers are:

Transport
There are no motorways in the district territory. The most important road that passess through the district is the I/13 from Karlovy Vary to Liberec.

Sights

The most important monuments in the district, protected as national cultural monuments, are:
Church of the Assumption of the Virgin Mary in Most
Jezeří Castle in Horní Jiřetín

The best-preserved settlement, which is the only one protected as a monument zone, is Litvínov-Osada.

The most visited tourist destination is the Jezeří Castle.

References

External links

Most District profile on the Czech Statistical Office's website

 
Districts of the Czech Republic